See also 1693 in piracy, other events in 1694, 1695 in piracy, and Timeline of piracy.

Europe
May 7 - Henry Every leads a mutiny aboard the privateer ship Charles II at A Coruña and turns the crew to piracy.

North America
April - Thomas Tew offloads his stolen treasure at Newport, Rhode Island.
November - Tew purchases new letter of marque from New York governor Benjamin Fletcher and sails on a new pirate cruise for the Indian Ocean.

Piracy
Piracy by year
1694 in military history